Ronald Joseph Genz (1930-2016) was an international speedway rider from England and Great Britain.

Speedway career 
Genz rode in the top tier of British Speedway from 1950-1972, riding for various clubs. He was capped by England 7 times and Great Britain once. He reached the final of the British Speedway Championship in 1961, 1962 and 1965.

References 

1930 births
2016 deaths
British speedway riders
New Cross Rangers riders
Newport Wasps riders
Oxford Cheetahs riders
Poole Pirates riders
Wolverhampton Wolves riders
Yarmouth Bloaters riders